Re Jeavons, ex parte Mackay (1873) LR 8 Ch App 643 is a UK insolvency law case. It decided that a creditor could not reserve an obligation to himself in priority of other creditors if a company were to go into liquidation.

Facts
Mr Joshua Jeavons had an iron manufacturing business (Joshua Jeavons & Company) at the Millwall Ironworks. Jeavons sold one John Brown & Co. Ltd a patent for improving armour plates manufacture. In return Brown would pay Jeavons royalties of 15s per ton of plates produced. Brown also lent Jeavons £12,500, and agreed that half Jeavons' royalties would go to paying back that loan. It was further agreed that if Jeavons went insolvent, or made an arrangement with creditors, Brown could keep all the royalties to satisfy the debt.

Judgment
The Chancery Division of the Court of Appeal held that Brown had a lien on one half of the royalties only. The agreement that Brown could retain all royalties if Jeavons went bankrupt was a fraud on the bankruptcy laws and void.

Mr. Fry, Q.C., and Mr. Henderson, then argued in support of the second appeal:—

Mr. De Gex, Q.C., and Mr. Finlay Knight, for the trustee, were not called on.

See also
UK company law

Notes

References

United Kingdom insolvency case law
1873 in case law
1873 in British law
Court of Appeal (England and Wales) cases